Joseph Harper (born January 13, 1966) is an American sprint canoer who competed in the mid-1990s. He was eliminated in the semifinals of the C-1 1000 m event at the 1996 Summer Olympics in Atlanta.

References
Sports-Reference.com profile

External links

1966 births
American male canoeists
Canoeists at the 1996 Summer Olympics
Living people
Olympic canoeists of the United States
Place of birth missing (living people)